Saint Kitts and Nevis competed at the 2020 Summer Olympics in Tokyo. Originally scheduled to take place from 24 July to 9 August 2020, the Games have been postponed to 23 July to 8 August 2021, because of the COVID-19 pandemic. It was the nation's seventh appearance at the Summer Olympics.

Competitors
The following is the list of number of competitors in the Games.

Athletics

Athletes from Saint Kitts and Nevis achieved the entry standards, either by qualifying time or by world ranking, in the following track and field events (up to a maximum of 3 athletes in each event):

Track & road events

See also
Saint Kitts and Nevis at the 2019 Pan American Games

References

Nations at the 2020 Summer Olympics
2020
Olympics